Hopewell (also, Laird) is an unincorporated community in Benton County, Mississippi, United States. it shares zip code 38683 with Walnut, Mississippi. A post office operated under the name Laird from 1894 to 1915.

References

Unincorporated communities in Benton County, Mississippi
Unincorporated communities in Mississippi